Maryanne Zéhil is a Lebanese-Canadian film producer, director, screenwriter, and author. Born in Beirut, Lebanon, she has lived in Montreal, Quebec, since 1996.

She founded Mia Productions in 2000.

Filmography
From My Window, Without a Home… (De ma fenêtre, sans maison...) - 2006
The Valley of Tears (La Vallée des larmes) - 2012
The Other Side of November (L'Autre côté de novembre) - 2016
The Sticky Side of Baklava (La Face cachée du baklava) - 2020

References

External links 

Lebanese film directors
Living people
Year of birth missing (living people)
Canadian women film directors
Film directors from Montreal
Lebanese emigrants to Canada
21st-century Canadian screenwriters
Canadian women screenwriters
Canadian screenwriters in French
Writers from Montreal